School Dayz is the first and only studio album released by child rapper Baby DC.

It was released on July 27, 1999 as the first release through Too Short and Jive Records' $hort Records imprint. Bay-Area producer and frequent Too Short collaborator Ant Banks handled most of the album's production.

School Dayz was released before So So Def's Lil' Bow Wow and No Limit's Lil Soldiers and Lil Romeo were releasing charting albums. However, due to limited promotion, School Dayz did not reach any Billboard charts. However, the single "Bounce, Rock, Skate, Roll" did make it to both the R&B and rap charts.

Track listing
"Kid Capri Intro" – :13  
"Bounce, Rock, Skate, Roll" – 4:47 (featuring Imajin) 
"Do That Dance (Say Uhh Ohh)" – 2:37
"Rich Kids 4 Life" – 2:58  
"Message from Snoop Dogg – :24  
"Candy Girl" – 3:40 (featuring Imajin) 
"I'm Feelin' You" – 3:34  
"That Ain't Much" – 4:00  
"Message from Ice Cube" – :17  
"Get Your Hustle On" – 4:33  
"Gimme Mine" – 4:33 (featuring E-40) 
"Video Game Playa" – 3:39  
"Poppa Was a Soldier" – 3:39 (featuring Ant Banks)

Charts

Bounce, Rock, Skate, Roll

References

1998 debut albums
Jive Records albums